Pooja Gandhi (born Sanjana Gandhi in 1983) is an Indian actress, who mainly works in Kannada, Hindi and Tamil films. After starring in the commercially successful 2006 film Mungaru Male, she became one of the most popular and highest paid actresses in Kannada cinema and also the recipient of several awards, including an honorary doctorate. Gandhi is popularly referred to as Male Hudugi (Rain Girl) in the media and Kannada film industry. Gandhi has acted in over five languages and 50 films in a decade. The Banglore Times placed her in the list of "25 Most Desirable Women of 2012".

Gandhi made her acting debut in 2001 with the Hindi film Khatron Ke Khiladi opposite Raj Babbar. Since then, she has played lead roles in commercially successful films such as Mungaru Male (2006), Milana (2007), Krishna (2007), Taj Mahal (2008), Budhivanta (2008), Anu (2009), Gokula (2009), Dandupalya (2012), Dandupalya 2 (2017) and  Dandupalya 3 (2018). Following the success of a series of films, she established herself as one of the leading actresses of Kannada cinema.

In 2016, Gandhi received an honorary doctorate award by the Governing Council of Confederation of International Accreditation Commission (CIAC) in affiliation with KEISIE International University - South Korea, for her contribution to the Kannada film industry.

She became a member of the Janata Dal (Secular) party in 2012, before joining the KJP party, and later, the BSR Congress party. She contested the Karnataka assembly elections from Raichur constituency, but failed to win a seat.

Early years and personal life
Gandhi was born in Meerut and brought up in Delhi into a traditional Punjabi family. Her father, Pawan Gandhi, is a businessman and her mother, Jyothi Gandhi, is a housewife. She studied at Sophia Convent and Dewan Public School in Meerut, Uttar Pradesh. She has two younger sisters – Radhika Gandhi, who is also an actress in Kannada films, and Suhani Gandhi, a tennis player. Gandhi started her career as a model by acting in advertisements and television series with Awaz (a remake of Lost in Hindi language) and a serial Zameen Se Aassman Tak, directed by Aruna Irani.

Gandhi got engaged in November 2012 with industrialist Anand Gowda but ended the relationship the following month.

Career

Debut (2001)

Gandhi started her career by acting in TV soaps, starting with Zameen Se Aassman Tak directed by Aruna Irani. She made her acting debut at the age of 18 in the Hindi film Khatron Ke Khiladi released in 2001. Later appeared in Bengali film Tomake Salam in 2003, she moved to the South Indian film industry with the Tamil film Kokki (2006). The film earned moderate reviews and had a successful run at the box office.

Initial success and fame in Kannada (2006–08)

Gandhi debut in the Kannada film industry was with Mungaru Male, The film was the first in India for any language to be screened for continuously one year in a multiplex, and ultimately ran over 865-days in Karnataka. And it was collected over ₹75 crore in its lifetime theatrical run at Indian box office. It went to become highest grossing South Indian film during its time of release. Gandhi has received applause for her character in the film as Nandini. Indicine.com's critic states that "Sanjana makes a confident debut". She then acted in the movie Milana with Puneeth Rajkumar, upon theatrical release on 14 September 2007, the film saw commercial success and completed a 500-day run in theatres. Later the film was dubbed into Malayalam as Ishtam Enikkishtam. In the same year Gandhi acted in Krishna film with her Mungaru male co-star Ganesh, it was the financial hit at the box office by completing 100-days. It marked as the second consecutive hit of the Ganesh and Gandhi pair after Mungaru Male. The Krishna marked her hat-trick 100-days film in her career in Kannada film industry.

In 2008, she starred in the financially successful Kannada language film Taj Mahal with Ajay Rao, which ran over 200 days in couple of centers of Karnataka. She was nominated for a Filmfare Best Actress Award, while Sify's critic wrote that "Pooja Gandhi looks pretty and has done a good job. rediff.com editor Vijaysarathy claims that "Pooja Gandhi looks stunning  and has worked hard to give a strong performance". Her next movie was Budhivanta alongside Upendra. It became the highest grossing Kannada film of 2008 and completed 100-days in main centres of Karnataka.

Series of commercial failures (2009–2011)
Gandhi went on to act in more than dozen of films in several languages including Kannada film industry, most of them went on to become commercially un-successful at the box office.

In 2010, Gandhi made her Telugu debut through the Mukkanti film opposite Nandamuri Taraka Ratna, along with Poorna. Which went on to become a financial failure at the box office.
 
In 2011, she acted her second film in Hindi with I Am, together with Juhi Chawla. "I Am" received mainly positive reviews from critics and audience upon the  theatrical release. The Times of India called it "an important and intelligent film" and The Film Street Journal named it "a must watch".
In 2012 I Am won the National Award for Best Hindi Film and Best Lyrics.

Critical acclaim and box office success (2012–18)

In 2012, Gandhi made a comeback through the female oriented film Dandupalya, which went on to become one of the highest-grossing films of Kannada industry and completed 100 days theatrical run in both Karnataka and Andhra Pradesh. And it collected over ₹40 crore against budget of ₹3 crore. Gandhi received Filmfare Award for Best Kannada Actress and Suvarna Fimfare Award for Best Actress for her performance in Dandupalya. The film was dubbed in Telugu and released as Dandupalyam. It was well received in Andhra Pradesh. A Tamil dub titled Karimedu was produced by Rama Narayanan's Sri Thenandal Films and released on 24 May 2013 to critical acclaim. it was hit in Tamil Nadu.
The film was dubbed in Malayalam and was titled as Kuruthikalam. Critics heaped praise on Gandhi for her performance. 
Rediff.com claimed that she was "walks away with acting honours. She is a stunner with her vain looks sans makeup throughout the movie and she has lived her role exceptionally well." while DNA's critic wrote that "viewers should not miss out on Pooja's performance." Business Standard's critic stated that "Pooja Gandhi as the leader of the gang is brilliant and extremely confident in her role. While some may typecast her performance as cheap and unwelcoming, I believe it takes guts for a regular heroine to shed her image and agree to play such a gritty part. She definitely deserves special mention for proving cliches wrong." The Times of India's critic stated that "Pooja Gandhi walks away with full honours."

In 2013, Gandhi made her debut in Malayalam film with Maad Dad (2013) together with Lal and Meghana Raj. Then she becomes  Item number for the Mata fame Guruprasad's directed Kannada film Director's Special (2013). According to sources said that Gandhi had rejected a request to do a special song in Devarane film, following days Pooja accepted this offer only because director Guruprasad wrote this song keeping me in mind. That makes it special, she appears in the song as Chanchal Champakali. In 2015, she starred and produced a film Abhinetri, also she introduced as Producer.

In 2017, she starred in the Dandupalya 2, which was the sequel of her previous film Dandupalya. In 2018 her next film was Dandupalya 3 or III,
which was simultaneously released in Kannada, Telugu and Tamil languages. acts along with almost same cast and crew. Gandhi received critical acclaim from critics and audience for her performance in the film. The writer Sunayana Suresh of The Times of India, stated "Pooja Gandhi in her uninhibited avatar is another person who deserves applause." The writer Sharadha of New Indian Express, stated that "Pooja Gandhi wins over the audience with her powerful performance."

Politics
Gandhi joined the Janata Dal (Secular) (JDS) party on 18 January 2012.

She then joined briefly the KJP, but she finally contested the 2013 Karnataka Legislative Assembly elections from Raichur on a BSR Congress ticket. This first attempt at public office proved unsuccessful.

Controversy 
Gandhi and Gandhi's film Dandupalya, criticised by social group Bahujan Samaj Horata Samiti for her controversial scene in this film, who claimed that its content was offensive. They objected specifically to the film's portrayal of women. Further controversy followed when it was revealed that actress Pooja Gandhi would appear topless in the film. 
 
After the release of the movie, Ambedkar Kranthi Sena activists demonstrated in Bengaluru against the film's "glorification of anti-social activities".

"According to the dictionary, nudity means that you are not covered with a single item of clothing from head to toe. But in this scene, I have worn a sari and I am trying to cover my body, except for my back".
says Gandhi about her controversial scene in the film

Filmography

As producer

Awards and nominations

Awards

Television shows
  She was one of the Top 5 finalist of the Bigg Boss Kannada 3 which was aired on Colors Kannada during 2016.

References

External links 

 

Living people
1983 births
21st-century Indian actresses
Actresses in Malayalam cinema
Actresses in Hindi cinema
Indian film actresses
Actresses in Kannada cinema
Actresses in Bengali cinema
Actresses in Tamil cinema
Indian women film producers
Punjabi people
People from Meerut
Janata Dal (Secular) politicians
Karnataka Janata Paksha politicians
BSR Congress politicians
21st-century Indian women politicians
21st-century Indian politicians
Film producers from Karnataka
Kannada film producers
Film producers from Uttar Pradesh
Female models from Uttar Pradesh
Female models from Karnataka
Women members of the Karnataka Legislative Assembly